Oscar Otte was the defending champion but chose not to defend his title.

Quentin Halys won the title after defeating Max Hans Rehberg 7–6(8–6), 6–3 in the final.

Seeds

Draw

Finals

Top half

Bottom half

References

External links
Main draw
Qualifying draw

Wolffkran Open - 1
2022 Singles